David Vernon Watson (born 5 October 1946) is an English former professional footballer who played for Notts County, Rotherham United, Sunderland, Manchester City, Werder Bremen, Southampton, Stoke City, Vancouver Whitecaps and Derby County as well at the England national team where he won 65 caps and was captain on three occasions. Watson is regarded as one of Sunderland’s greatest defenders of all time.

Playing career
Watson was born in Stapleford, Nottinghamshire, and started his career in 1966 as a striker with hometown club Notts County making 26 appearances in two seasons, before moving to Second Division Rotherham United in 1968. Watson was signed by Tommy Docherty in a player exchange deal which involved Keith Pring, going to Notts County and the Millers paying £1,000. He was thrust into a relegation battle with Rotherham in 1967–68 which was unsuccessful which led to Docherty's departure. In came Jim McAnearney who installed him as club captain and continued to use him both in defence and up-front. After four seasons at Millmoor, making 141 appearances scoring 21 goals he caught the attention of Sunderland manager Alan Brown who paid £100,000 for his services in December 1970.

At Roker Park, Watson began at centre forward, which many believed hindered their chances of gaining promotion. It was not until Bob Stokoe took over in November 1972 that Watson began to play at centre back and it paid off with Sunderland reaching the 1973 FA Cup Final where they beat First Division Leeds United 1–0. Watson was singled out for praise from Stokoe after the match for keeping Leeds's strike pairing of Allan Clarke and Mick Jones quiet. Following Sunderland's cup success the expectation was now for the club to gain promotion but they missed out by two points in both 1973–74 and 1974–75.

In the summer of 1975, Watson joined First Division Manchester City for a fee of £175,000 in a deal which saw Jeff Clarke move the other way. Watson spent four seasons at Maine Road which saw Man City miss out on the title in 1976–77 by one point. They did win the League Cup in 1976 beating Newcastle United 2–1. He left Manchester City in the summer of 1979 for German Bundesliga side Werder Bremen. His time at Bremen was short as after making his debut in a 1–0 win over Bayer Uerdingen he was sent off in his second match against 1860 Munich for "pushing" Hermann Bitz and banned by the German FA for eight weeks. He was fined by his club and refused to travel to an away match against FC Schalke 04 because of an injury before turning up to play for England.

Unsurprisingly, he was back in England by October with Southampton paying £200,000. Watson played 31 games in 1979–80 and 44 games in 1980–81 as the Saints finished 8th and 6th respectively. However, he was dropped by Lawrie McMenemy during the next season and he joined Stoke City in January 1982. He played 24 times for Stoke in 1981–82 helping them to avoid relegation. He then played 40 times in 1982–83 as Stoke finished in a mid-table position of 13th. Watson then spent the summer of 1983 with the Vancouver Whitecaps before ending his career with a season each at Derby County and his first club Notts County.

International career
Watson's performances at Centre Half for Sunderland were noticed at the highest level and less than a year after the FA Cup win and despite playing in the Second Division he was given his debut for England in a friendly game against Portugal in Lisbon. Watson – quite advanced in years for a debutant at 27 – was one of six first-timers on show (among the others were Trevor Brooking) in what would prove to be 1966 World Cup-winning manager Alf Ramsey's last game in charge. Later in 1974, Watson won his second cap in a 2–0 defeat by Scotland at Hampden Park, Glasgow, coming on as a substitute for Norman Hunter. His first competitive game at international level was his seventh appearance in all as England defeated Czechoslovakia 3–0 at Wembley in a qualifier for the 1976 European Championships. Despite this scoreline, England would not ultimately qualify for the finals while the Czechoslovak team would go on to win it. He played every minute of England's fixtures that year, including World Cup qualifying victories over Luxembourg (twice) and Italy, though after the Italians had earlier defeated England in the campaign and had a better goals record against Luxembourg. England missed out on the finals for a second successive tournament. Watson did not miss another England game until 1980.

During the same year, Watson's establishment as England's first choice central defender was galvanised by a 4–3 victory over Denmark in Copenhagen which set the seal on a qualification for the 1980 European Championships – England's first major tournament qualification for a decade. Watson continued his England career, earning his 50th cap against Argentina in a warm-up game prior to the European Championships in Italy. Watson duly played in all three of England's group games – against Belgium, Italy and Spain – but a draw, defeat and victory respectively was not enough for England to progress. His final appearance for England came against Iceland in June 1982 having gained 65 caps. He was excluded from the squad for the 1982 FIFA World Cup, with manager Ron Greenwood selecting only three specialist central defenders, Phil Thompson, Terry Butcher and Steve Foster. He did however, appear in the video for This Time We’ll Get It Right, England’s 1982 World Cup song. Watson remains the most-capped England player never to play in a World Cup finals match.

Personal life
Born in the small town of Stapleford, Dave regularly played football with his four brothers, one of them (Peter), ended up playing for Nottingham Forest. He played youth football for Stapleford Old Boys and left school to work as a farm labourer and then as an electrician. In February 2020, it was reported that Watson, aged 73, was suffering from a neurodegenerative disease with his wife, Penny, suspecting that "head injuries and repeated heading of the ball" were the cause.

Career statistics

Club

International

Honours
Sunderland
 FA Cup: 1972-73
Manchester City
 League Cup: 1975-76

England
British Home Championship: 1973-73 (shared), 1974-75, 1977-78, 1978-79, 1981-82

Individual
PFA Division Two Team of the Year: 1973-74, 1974-75
PFA Division One Team of the Year: 1978-79, 1979-80

References

External links
 
 
 
 Dave Watson Interview at talksport.co.uk

1946 births
Living people
People from Stapleford, Nottinghamshire
Footballers from Nottinghamshire
Association football central defenders
England international footballers
English footballers
English expatriate footballers
Notts County F.C. players
Rotherham United F.C. players
Sunderland A.F.C. players
Manchester City F.C. players
Southampton F.C. players
Stoke City F.C. players
Vancouver Whitecaps (1974–1984) players
Derby County F.C. players
Fort Lauderdale Sun players
Kettering Town F.C. players
English Football League players
North American Soccer League (1968–1984) players
United Soccer League (1984–85) players
UEFA Euro 1980 players
SV Werder Bremen players
Bundesliga players
Expatriate footballers in Germany
Expatriate soccer players in Canada
English expatriate sportspeople in the United States
Expatriate soccer players in the United States
English expatriate sportspeople in Canada
English expatriate sportspeople in Germany
FA Cup Final players